There are 20 ice rinks in total around Australia. They are used for recreational, educational and private use. Most of these ice rinks have private lessons in all aspects of ice sports such as ice hockey and figure skating.

Current venues
Current permanent indoor ice skating venues in Australia.

Australian Capital Territory

New South Wales

Northern Territory

Queensland

South Australia

Victoria

Western Australia

Former venues
Former ice skating venues in Australia.

See also

List of Australian Football League grounds
List of Australian cricket grounds
List of indoor arenas in Australia
List of National Basketball League (Australia) venues
List of Australian rugby league stadiums
List of Australian rugby union stadiums
List of soccer stadiums in Australia
List of Oceanian stadiums by capacity

References

External links
 Sydney Ice Rinks map

Ice rinks in Australia
Ice rinks
Ice rinks
Ice rinks
Ice rinks

Winter sports in Australia